Eldon is a city in Miller County, Missouri, United States, located  southwest of Jefferson City. The population was 4,567 at the 2010 census.

History
Eldon was platted in 1881, and according to tradition, named after a railroad official.  A post office called Eldon has been in operation since 1881.

2019 tornado

On the night of May 22, 2019, a tornado touched down west of Eldon. It came through Eldon damaging many homes and businesses. That same tornado struck Jefferson City later in the evening.

Geography
Eldon is located near the head of Saline Creek. The city is served by U.S. Route 54 and Missouri Route 52. It is also served by Missouri Route 87.

Climate

Demographics

2020 census

2010 census
As of the census of 2010, there were 4,567 people, 1,984 households, and 1,158 families living in the city. The racial makeup of the city was 95.9% White, 0.5% African American, 0.5% Native American, 0.4% Asian, 0.3% Pacific Islander, 0.4% from other races, and 1.9% from two or more races. Hispanic or Latino of any race were 1.4% of the population.

There were 1,984 households, of which 31.0% had children under the age of 18 living with them, 38.4% were married couples living together, 14.6% had a female householder with no husband present, 5.4% had a male householder with no wife present, and 41.6% were non-families. 36.8% of all households were made up of individuals, and 17.4% had someone living alone who was 65 years of age or older. The average household size was 2.27 and the average family size was 2.94.

The median age in the city was 38.7 years. 24.7% of residents were under the age of 18; 7.7% were between the ages of 18 and 24; 24.4% were from 25 to 44; 24.1% were from 45 to 64; and 19.1% were 65 years of age or older. The gender makeup of the city was 47.0% male and 53.0% female.

2000 census
As of the census of 2000, there were 4,895 people, 2,194 households, and 1,270 families living in the city. The population density was 1,450.2 people per square mile (559.2/km2). There were 2,396 housing units at an average density of 709.8 per square mile (273.7/km2). The racial makeup of the city was 98.14% White, 0.33% African American, 0.31% Native American, 0.16% Asian, 0.31% from other races, and 0.76% from two or more races. Hispanic or Latino of any race were 1.16% of the population.

There were 2,194 households, out of which 26.5% had children under the age of 18 living with them, 41.8% were married couples living together, 12.5% had a female householder with no husband present, and 42.1% were non-families. 38.1% of all households were made up of individuals, and 20.6% had someone living alone who was 65 years of age or older. The average household size was 2.18 and the average family size was 2.88.

In the city, the population was spread out, with 23.2% under the age of 18, 8.7% from 18 to 24, 24.5% from 25 to 44, 20.8% from 45 to 64, and 22.7% who were 65 years of age or older. The median age was 40 years. For every 100 females, there were 83.1 males. For every 100 females age 18 and over, there were 75.6 males.

The median income for a household in the city was $27,103, and the median income for a family was $34,621. Males had a median income of $27,818 versus $17,690 for females. The per capita income for the city was $15,015. 15.8% of the population and 12.0% of families were below the poverty line. Out of the total population, 22.5% of those under the age of 18 and 16.4% of those 65 and older were living below the poverty line.

Education 
Education in the city of Eldon is provided by two elementary schools, one middle school and one high school. It also includes the Eldon Career Center, which provides quality training in many technical fields.
Eldon has a public library, a branch of the Heartland Regional Library System.

Popular culture
 The television show Petticoat Junction, which aired from 1963 to 1970, was based on the Burris Hotel that existed in this small railroad town in the midwest. Paul Henning, the producer and creator of the show, was married to the granddaughter of the owner of the hotel and often visited.

Notable people
 Christian Cantwell, 2008 Olympic shot-put silver medalist
 Jim Golden, baseball player.
 William Mueller, professional wrestler known under the names "Trevor Murdoch" and "Jethro Holiday"
 Harley Race, professional wrestler
 Lloyd Dane, early NASCAR champion

References

External links
 Historic maps of Eldon in the Sanborn Maps of Missouri Collection at the University of Missouri

Cities in Miller County, Missouri
Cities in Missouri